Dinding Bypass, Federal Route 60, is a highway bypass in Manjung district, Perak, Malaysia. The bypass connecting Damar Laut in the north until Sitiawan in the south. The bypass was opened on 30 April 2001. It also featured the second longest river bridge in Malaysia, the Raja Pemaisuri Bainun Bridge crossing Dinding River.

List of junctions and towns

References
 Malaysia Road Atlas
 World Express Mapping

Highways in Malaysia